Alberto Zarzur (December 22, 1912 – July 7, 1958) was a Brazilian international footballer who played for Brazilian clubs Atlético Santista, São Paulo da Floresta, Vasco da Gama and São Paulo, and for the Argentine club San Lorenzo.

Zarzur was born and died in Rio de Janeiro.  He played for the Brazil national football team in the Copa América Argentina 1937.

Titles
 São Paulo da Floresta 1931 (Campeonato Paulista)
 Vasco da Gama 1936 (Campeonato Carioca)
 São Paulo 1943 and 1945 (Campeonato Paulista)

References

External links
 

1912 births
1958 deaths
Association football midfielders
Brazilian footballers
Brazilian expatriate footballers
Brazil international footballers
CR Vasco da Gama players
San Lorenzo de Almagro footballers
São Paulo FC players
Expatriate footballers in Argentina
Footballers from Rio de Janeiro (city)